The D.A.C. was an automobile manufactured in Detroit, Michigan by the Detroit Air-Cooled Car Company from 1922 to 1923. The car debuted at the Detroit Automobile Show in early 1922, with the company planning on producing 10,000 cars a year. Production never reached these figures. Approximately 25 cars were built in the Detroit factory on Cass Avenue. A new factory was built in 1923, at Wayne, Michigan, where 100 cars were built before the company failed. Both open and closed models were produced. Prices ranged from $1250 for the tourer, to $1700 for the coupe and $1750 for the sedan.

See also
List of defunct automobile manufacturers

References

External links
Front view of touring model
"Twin-Three" 6-cylinder engine

Defunct motor vehicle manufacturers of the United States
Motor vehicle manufacturers based in Michigan
Defunct manufacturing companies based in Michigan